

139001–139100 

|-id=028
| 139028 Haynald ||  || Lajos Haynald (1816–1891) Hungarian cardinal and Archbishop of Kalocsa-Bács, botanist, patron of the sciences, who had the Haynald Astronomical Observatory built in Kalocsa || 
|}

139101–139200 

|-bgcolor=#f2f2f2
| colspan=4 align=center | 
|}

139201–139300 

|-bgcolor=#f2f2f2
| colspan=4 align=center | 
|}

139301–139400 

|-bgcolor=#f2f2f2
| colspan=4 align=center | 
|}

139401–139500 

|-bgcolor=#f2f2f2
| colspan=4 align=center | 
|}

139501–139600 

|-bgcolor=#f2f2f2
| colspan=4 align=center | 
|}

139601–139700 

|-bgcolor=#f2f2f2
| colspan=4 align=center | 
|}

139701–139800 

|-bgcolor=#f2f2f2
| colspan=4 align=center | 
|}

139801–139900 

|-bgcolor=#f2f2f2
| colspan=4 align=center | 
|}

139901–140000 

|-bgcolor=#f2f2f2
| colspan=4 align=center | 
|}

References 

139001-140000